Pachybathron guadeloupense is a species of sea snail, a marine gastropod mollusk, in the family Cystiscidae.

Distribution
This species occurs in Guadeloupe.

References

guadeloupense
Gastropods described in 2014